Coptosapelteae is a tribe incertae sedis of flowering plants in the family Rubiaceae and contains about 55 species in 2 genera. Its representatives are found in tropical and subtropical Asia. This tribe has not been placed within as subfamily of Rubiaceae, but is sister to the rest of the family.

Genera
Currently accepted names
 Acranthera Arn. ex Meisn. (39 sp)
 Coptosapelta Korth. (16 sp)

Synonyms
Androtropis R.Br. ex Wall. = Acranthera
Gonyanera Korth. = Acranthera
Psilobium Jack = Acranthera
Thysanospermum Champ. ex Benth. = Coptosapelta

References

 
Rubiaceae tribes